Alan Douglas Ruck (born July 1, 1956) is an American actor. He is best known for portraying Cameron Frye, Ferris Bueller's best friend, in John Hughes's film Ferris Bueller's Day Off (1986); Stuart Bondek, a lecherous, power-hungry member of the mayor's staff in the ABC sitcom Spin City; and Connor Roy, the eldest son of a media magnate, in the HBO series Succession. His other notable parts include those in Bad Boys (1983), Three Fugitives (1989), Young Guns II (1990), Speed (1994), and Twister (1996). In 2016, he co-starred with Geena Davis in an updated Fox TV adaptation of William Peter Blatty's best-selling novel The Exorcist.

Early life
Ruck was born in Cleveland, Ohio, to a schoolteacher mother and a father who worked for a pharmaceutical company. He attended Parma Senior High School in Parma, Ohio, and graduated from the University of Illinois with a B.F.A. in drama in 1979. He recalled:

Ruck made his Broadway debut in 1985 in Neil Simon's Biloxi Blues with Matthew Broderick. He was soon a stage actor at theaters around the US, including the Wisdom Bridge Theatre in Chicago. In his initial foray into film, Ruck appeared in Class and Hard Knocks as well as some television films.

Career
Ruck's first film role was in the 1983 drama film Bad Boys, in which he played Carl Brennan, Sean Penn's friend in the film. The same year he played Roger Jackson in Class. Three years later, Ruck was cast as Cameron Frye, Ferris Bueller's hypochondriac best friend in John Hughes' Ferris Bueller's Day Off after Broderick encouraged him to audition for the role -- their real-life friendship was reportedly a factor in Ruck's being cast. One of his other film roles was in the 1987 film Three for the Road.

Ruck later appeared in the 1989 comedy film Three Fugitives. Following that, he played a significant role as Hendry William French in Young Guns II, the 1990 sequel to Young Guns. He also played Captain John Harriman of the USS Enterprise-B in the 1994 film Star Trek Generations, a role that he has reprised along with Generations co-star Walter Koenig and other Trek alumni in the fan film Of Gods and Men. Alan also played an annoying tourist named Doug Stephens on an ill-fated bus in the blockbuster Speed. Another supporting role was of the eccentric storm chaser Robert 'Rabbit' Nurick in the 1996 disaster film Twister.

From 1990 to 1991, Ruck starred as Chicago ad man Charlie Davis, in the ABC series Going Places. ABC canceled the series after one season (22 episodes). He appeared in the series Daddy's Girls in 1994, which was canceled after three episodes. From 1996 to 2002, Alan played Stuart Bondek in the sitcom Spin City alongside Michael J. Fox and later, Charlie Sheen. In 2005, he played Leo Bloom in the Broadway version of Mel Brooks' The Producers, a role also played by  his Ferris Bueller co-star, Matthew Broderick.

Ruck was then cast in the pilot of the Tim Minear-created Fox Network series Drive, but did not appear in the actual series. He also starred in one episode of the Comedy Central sitcom Stella as Richard, a man looking for work. He later starred in the season two Scrubs episode "My Lucky Day" as a patient, and played reporter Steve Jacobson on the ESPN miniseries The Bronx Is Burning.

In 1998, Ruck guest starred in the fifth episode of the HBO miniseries From the Earth to the Moon as the NASA engineer Tom Dolan.

In 2006, Ruck guest starred in a single episode of Stargate Atlantis called "The Real World" and, in 2007, as unscrupulous property developer Albert Bunford in an episode of Medium.

In the 2007 comedy Kickin' It Old Skool, he appears as Dr. Frye, a possible connection to Cameron Frye; he even mentions still trying to pay off an old Ferrari, a reference to Cameron totaling his dad's Ferrari in Ferris Bueller's Day Off.

Ruck played the part of a ghost of a family man in the 2008 film Ghost Town starring Ricky Gervais. In 2009, he had a minor role as a married man named Frank in an episode of Cougar Town. In his role, he has problems with his marriage due to a crush he had long ago on Jules, played by Courteney Cox.

Ruck also has a small role in the 2008 M. Night Shyamalan film The Happening. He played the role of Dean Bowman in the college fraternity drama Greek. He appeared in a guest role as a manic geologist in an episode of Eureka. Additionally, he plays Mr. Cooverman in the film I Love You, Beth Cooper. In 2009, Ruck filmed the medical drama Extraordinary Measures in Portland, Oregon, with star Harrison Ford.

Ruck then appeared as a bank robber in a season three episode of the USA Network series Psych, and as a lawyer in season five of the ABC series Boston Legal. He guest starred as Martin, a magazine reporter, on an episode of Ruby & the Rockits entitled "We Are Family?".

In 2010, Ruck was cast as a lead character in the NBC mystery-drama, Persons Unknown. He also guest-starred on the television show Fringe as a scientist turned criminal, in the NCIS: Los Angeles season two episode "Borderline", and guest-starred as ex-money laundering accountant turned dentist on an episode of Justified entitled "Long in the Tooth". He also appeared in the Grey's Anatomy season five episode "In The Midnight Hour".

In 2012, Ruck was cast in the ABC Family series Bunheads as the husband to Sutton Foster's character, Michelle. In 2013, he appeared in NCIS, guest-starring in the season 11 episode, "Gut Check".

In autumn 2016, Ruck began a 10-episode run on The Exorcist as Henry Rance, the husband (who has suffered mild brain damage in a vaguely explained accident) of Angela Rance (Geena Davis), better known as the adult Regan MacNeil, the tortured girl (played by Linda Blair) who is possessed by a demon in the 1973 hit film The Exorcist. 

In 2018, Ruck began in the role of Connor Roy in the Emmy-award winning HBO series Succession.

Personal life

Ruck married Claudia Stefany in 1984. They have two children: a daughter, Emma, and a son, Sam. They divorced in 2005. On January 4, 2008, he married actress Mireille Enos, whom he met in 2005 while co-starring in the Broadway revival of Absurd Person Singular. Mireille gave birth to their daughter Vesper in 2010. Their son Larkin was born in July 2014.

Filmography

Film

Television

References

External links

 
 
 

1956 births
20th-century American male actors
21st-century American male actors
American male film actors
American male musical theatre actors
American male television actors
Living people
Male actors from Cleveland
University of Illinois College of Fine and Applied Arts alumni